"How Soon We Forget" is a 1987 single by Colonel Abrams, from his album You and Me Equals Us.  The single was Abrams' last of four number one hits on the dance play charts. "How Soon We Forget" was also Abrams' most successful single on the soul charts, reaching number six.

Track listing
12" single

Charts
Weekly Charts

References

External links
 How Soon We Forget at Discogs.

1987 singles
Colonel Abrams songs
1987 songs
MCA Records singles